Charumati Stupa (also known as Chabahil Stupa, and Dhan Dhoj Stupa) is a stupa in Kathmandu, Nepal.

History 
It was built by Charumati, daughter of the Indian emperor Ashoka, in the 4th century. 

In 2003, Charumati Stupa was restored by the locals as it was crumbling due to the "heavy vehicular traffic on the nearby road". During its restoration process countless artefacts, coins, and manuscripts were found possibly dating back to the Licchavi era. It was again restored in 2015 due to the April 2015 Nepal earthquake.

References 

Stupas in Nepal
Buddhist pilgrimage sites in Nepal
Religious buildings and structures in Kathmandu
Tourist attractions in Kathmandu
4th-century establishments in Nepal